Chhuhiya is a village under Kamach Post in Kusmi Tehsil of Sidhi district of Madhya Pradesh state of India. It is birthplace of MLA Kunwar Singh Tekam.

Villages in Sidhi district